Andha Naal Nyabagam is a 2005 Tamil-language drama film written and directed by Mani Bharathi, who earlier directed Anbe Anbe (2003). The film stars Ramana, Sridevika, Tejashree, and Vadivelu.

Cast
Ramana as Gurumoorthy
Sridevika
Tejashree as Ritha
Vadivelu
Indu
Ramji 
Y. G. Mahendran
Thalaivasal Vijay

Production
The film which was based on real events was earlier titled as Flashback but was later changed to Andha Naal Nyabagum in line with the 'unwritten rule' of keeping Tamil titles for films.

Soundtrack
The soundtrack was composed by Bharadwaj.

Critical reception
A critic noted that "Manibharathi crafts the screenplay in an interesting way. Most of the movie is a flashback and the scenes that launch the flashbacks are mounted in a way that makes us interested in how the flashback is going to play out."

References

2005 films
2000s Tamil-language films
Indian romantic drama films
Films scored by Bharadwaj (composer)